INS Veer (K82) (Brave) was a  of the Indian Navy.

INS Veer was a part of the 25th "Killer" Missile Squadron of the Indian Navy.

Operation Trident
During the Indo-Pakistani War of 1971, INS Veer was one of the three missile boats in the Operation Trident task force. On the afternoon of 4 December, the strike group made its way towards Karachi.

Veer launched 1 SS-N-2 'Styx' missile on the target, sinking PNS Muhafiz.

Other vessels of strike group sank a Pakistan Navy destroyer,  and the merchant ship , and caused irreparable damage to the destroyer .

Lieutenant Commander Om Prakash Mehta, the commanding officer of the Veer was awarded the Vir Chakra for his role during the operation. Lieutenant Phool Kumar Puri, Engineering Officer, INS Veer was awarded the Nau Sena Medal for his efforts in the Indo-Pakistani War of 1971.

References

Vidyut-class missile boats
Fast attack craft of the Indian Navy